The Thirteen of Steel (German: Die Dreizehn aus Stahl) is a 1921 German silent crime film directed by Johannes Guter and starring Carl de Vogt, Georg H. Schnell and Claire Lotto. It was produced by Erich Pommer for Decla-Bioscop before the company merged with UFA. It was shot at the Babelsberg Studios in Berlin. The film's sets were designed by the art director Franz Seemann.

Cast
 Carl de Vogt as Frank Steen
 Georg H. Schnell as Robert Chester
 Claire Lotto	as Mary Reading
 Rudolf Hofbauer as Davis		
 Joseph Klein as Ship's Captain	
 Nien Soen Ling as Wirt zum "Tanzenden Chinesen"			
 Auguste Prasch-Grevenberg	 as Pensionsvorsteherin			
 Camillo Triembacher as Beverley		
 Lo Wedekind as  Sidd	
 Lore Busch	as 	Wirtin zur "Weißen Maus"	
 Paul Hallström as Wirt zur "Schwarzen Ratte"

References

Bibliography
 Giesen, Rolf . The Nosferatu Story: The Seminal Horror Film, Its Predecessors and Its Enduring Legacy. McFarland, 2019.
 Hardt, Ursula. From Caligari to California: Erich Pommer's life in the International Film Wars. Berghahn Books, 1996.
 Jacobsen, Wolfgang. Babelsberg: das Filmstudio. Argon, 1994.

External links

1921 films
1921 crime films
German crime films
Films of the Weimar Republic
German silent feature films
Films directed by Johannes Guter
Films produced by Erich Pommer
German black-and-white films
Films shot at Babelsberg Studios
1920s German films